The Shops at Ledgewood Commons is a shopping plaza in Ledgewood, New Jersey, United States. Its anchors are Ashley Furniture HomeStores, Marshalls, Walmart, and Burlington. From the mall's opening in 1972 until 2016, it was branded Ledgewood Mall as a  enclosed mall.

History

The center was originally opened in 1972 as Ledgewood Mall, with anchors of W. T. Grant store and Finast. By 1980, the mall's anchors were Rickel, Jamesway, and Arthur's Catalog Showroom. These anchors remained for over a decade.

The Rickel space later closed and became Phar-Mor and Marshalls. Federated Department Stores announced in July 1993 that it would be opening a  Stern's store in the fall of 1994, as part of a major nationwide expansion of the chain. This store was converted to a Macy's in 2001 when Stern's stores were closed. Jamesway closed in December 1995 following the company's liquidation. By 1999, Walmart replaced both the former Jamesway and Arthur's stores, and Circuit City, which has since closed as part of the economic collapse of that retail chain, was added as well. Phar-Mor eventually became an Ashley Furniture HomeStore location. From 2009 to 2017, Circuit City became Spirit Halloween every September until October. In 2018 the Spirit Halloween relocated to the nearby Roxbury Mall.

By 2013, many of the mall's former tenants relocated to the nearby Roxbury Mall, including Jo-Ann, W. Kodak Jewelers and Weight Watchers. Puffin Jewelry moved to West 10 Plaza then the Nail House building. Many other stores closed, including  Hero Town, Just A Buck, Wonder Nails and em’s Irish gift shop.

PMZ Landscpaing relocated from the property in 2018 to Hackettstown, NJ. During the same year Delizia Pizza Kitchen relocated to the nearby Morris Canal Plaza.

In 2016, JV Partnership, Advance Realty, Debartolo Development & Invesco bought the mall. The owners had plans for a redevelopment that would turn the mall into an open-air power center. The owners announced that Barnes & Noble would get a new building where Sports Authority once was. The former Macy's building was demolished on November 30, 2017, which kicked off the construction project. As of June 2018, much of the mall had been demolished, with only a small seating area remaining open between Marshalls and Ashley Home Furniture. What is not already demolished had been closed off to the public. On September 26, 2018, the owners of the mall announced that Five Below, Ulta Beauty, DSW, Starbucks, Chipotle Mexican Grill and Five Guys had signed leases and would open stores in the mall.

On December 6, 2018, Walmart announced that it would demolish its current store at the Shops at Ledgewood Commons for a new modern supercenter store. The old store closed on May 10, 2019, and Walmart started construction on the new store in June 2019, which opened on October 7, 2020, Walmart had originally planned to open on October 17, 2020, but construction finished early and the opening date was moved sooner.

In 2019, Lemon Tree Hair Salon opened in the former Pizza Hut.

On January 16, 2019, 24 Hour Fitness announced that it would open a gym at the mall. However, on August 27, 2020, the company pulled out of the project due to the company filing for bankruptcy.

That same day, Barnes & Noble permanently closed its location at the mall, after being at Ledgewood from 1994 to 2020.

On September 9, 2020, Burlington Department Store announced it would officially open a store at the new mall.

On October 7, 2020, it was announced that At Home would open in the space where 24 Hour Fitness was going to be.

On February 18, 2021, Five Below, Starbucks & Chipotle Mexican Grill  opened at The Shops At Ledgewood Commons.

On March 19, 2021, Burlington Department Store opened at The Shops At Ledgewood Commons.

Ulta Beauty, Panda Express & Five Guys opened at The Shops At Ledgewood Commons in April 2021.

On July 30, 2021, The Shops At Ledgewood Commons held a grand opening ribbon cutting ceremony which marked the official opening of the new open air power center.

Controversy 
The construction of the Shops at Ledgewood Commons was given an exception from Governor Phil Murphy's Essential Construction order during COVID-19. Construction workers protested the decision, though the Mayor of Roxbury Township said that the project is essential since the center has a Walmart and restaurants. The Walmart temporarily closed in 2019 for a new supercenter store.

References

Buildings and structures in Morris County, New Jersey
Roxbury Township, New Jersey
Shopping malls in New Jersey
Shopping malls established in 1972
Shopping malls in the New York metropolitan area